Danyliuk or Danylyuk (alternatively spelled as Daniliuk  or Danilyuk) is a Ukrainian surname derived from the given name Danylo or Danilo. Notable people with this surname include: 

 Artem Danylyuk (born 2001), Ukrainian footballer
 Oleksandr Danylyuk (born 1975), Ukrainian politician and statesman
 Oleksandr Danylyuk (lawyer) (born 1981), Ukrainian lawyer and human rights activist
 Roman Danyliuk (born 1993), Ukrainian Paralympic athlete
 Ruslan Danilyuk (born 1974), Belarusian footballer
 Mariya Omelianovych née Danilyuk (born 1960), Ukrainian rower

See also
 
 
 

Ukrainian-language surnames

uk:Данилюк